Roxboro is the name of several places:

Roxboro, Quebec, now part of the Pierrefonds-Roxboro borough of Montreal, Quebec, Canada
Roxboro, North Carolina, United States of America
Roxboro, Limerick, a townland in Co Limerick, Ireland
Roxboro, Calgary, a neighbourhood of Calgary, Alberta, Canada

See also
Roxborough (disambiguation)
Roxburgh (disambiguation)
Roxbury (disambiguation)